Dead City is a 1951 Greek drama film directed by Frixos Iliadis. It was entered into the 1952 Cannes Film Festival.

Cast
 Irene Papas (as Eirini Pappa) as Lena
 Nikos Tzogias as Petros Petrokostas
 Eleni Zafeiriou as Gianna
 Giannis Argyris as Lambros
 Christina Kalogerikou as Petrokosta
 Lakis Skellas as Giannakos
 Giorgos Foundas as Mathios
 Anthi Miliadi as farmer
 Anny Papageorgiou as farmer

References

External links

1951 films
1950s Greek-language films
1951 drama films
Greek black-and-white films
Films scored by Manos Hatzidakis
Greek drama films